Jane Holmes Dixon (born Jane Hart Holmes; July 24, 1937 – December 25, 2012) was an American bishop of the  Episcopal Church. She was a suffragan bishop in the Episcopal Diocese of Washington and served as Bishop of Washington pro tempore from 2001 to June 2002. She was the second woman consecrated as a bishop in the Episcopal Church.  She died unexpectedly in her sleep in her home in Cathedral Heights on Christmas Day morning in 2012.

Personal life
Dixon was born in Winona, Mississippi in 1937 and, after graduating from Vanderbilt University, spent her early life as a teacher and mother, raising three children.

Theological education
Dixon enrolled at Virginia Theological Seminary at the age of 40, receiving her Master of Divinity degree in 1982. She later received the degree of Doctor of Divinity in 1993.

As Bishop of Washington pro tempore
During her tenure as bishop pro tempore, Dixon sued in federal court to remove a priest, Samuel Edwards, from his position as a parish rector of Christ Church in Accokeek, Maryland. She had refused to approve Edwards's appointment early in 2001, since Edwards opposed the Episcopal Church's beliefs about female and homosexual clergy. Following several months of acrimony, Dixon filed suit to have Edwards removed. The court ruled in her favor in October 2001. After several appeals, the initial decision stood. She retired following the election of the Right Rev. John B. Chane.

Notes

Bibliography
Broadway, Bill (2002). "Ancient Rite Consecrates New Bishop". Washington Post. June 2.
Caldwell, Deborah (2003). "Family Feud; For Episcopalians, the Price of Divorce May Be Too High". The New York Times. August 10.
Fahrenthold, David (2001). "Ousted Md. Priest Faces Charge in His Church". Washington Post. December 19.
Hein, David, and Shattuck, Gardiner H. (2004). The Episcopalians. Westport: Praeger.
Maraniss, David and Ellen Nakashima (2000). The Prince of Tennessee: The Rise of Al Gore. New York: Simon and Schuster.

Women Anglican bishops
1937 births
2012 deaths
People from Winona, Mississippi
20th-century American Episcopalians
Episcopal bishops of Washington
Virginia Theological Seminary alumni
Vanderbilt University alumni